The Ludwig Foundation of Cuba (LFC) is a non-governmental, non-profit institution located in Havana, Cuba, created with the mission of protecting and promoting Cuban artists in Cuba and internationally.

History 
After seeing an exhibition of Cuban Art in Düsseldorf, Germany, the art patrons and collectors Peter and Irene Ludwig began to interest themselves in contemporary Cuban art. They made many visits to Cuba and formed an important collection of Cuban art, including artists such as Belkis Ayón Manso, José Braulio Bedia Valdés, Los Carpinteros, Antonio Eligio Fernández, Kcho and Marta Mariá Pérez Bravo. This couple of world-renowned European private collectors, develop the idea to create a Ludwig Museum in Havana, with an annual support of their Peter and Irene Ludwig Foundation located in Aachen. This German Foundation has links with more than twenty public museums based in Europe and Asia. However the creation of such a Project became impossible at the time, so they decided that a foundation with the mission of protecting and promoting Cuban artists in Cuba and abroad would be the idea. Thus, Ludwig's commitment and cooperation allowed the new foundation, the first in South America, to respond to the enormous economic difficulties of the island, which had previously caused the emigration of artists and the weakening of cultural institutions.

Created in 1995 as an autonomous, non-governmental and non-profit public entity, the Ludwig Foundation of Cuba is today an important center that helps protect, preserve and promote the work of contemporary Cuban artists in and outside of Cuba. It is administered by the American Friends of the Ludwig Foundation of Cuba (AFLFC), and is directed by its current president Helmo Hernández.

Exhibitions and events 
The exhibitions and cultural exchanges of the Foundation have allowed Cuban artists to establish important dialogues with their international colleagues. If at first the institution directed its interest towards the visual arts, very soon it became involved with experimentation in the performing arts. From architecture, dance performances to mobile app development and from theatrical readings to graphic design, the Foundation works to educate, promote and protect the work of Cuba's emerging artists. They organize exhibitions at their headquarters as well as in other museums, as was the case of the Gerardo Rueda exhibition at the San Francisco Convent in Havana in 1999. Among the artists exhibited at the Foundation we find María Elena González, José Manuel Fors, Charly Nijensohn, Esterio Segura Mora, Grupo ABTV, Keith Anthony Morrison, Alberto Sarrain and Juan Carlos Alom, who collaborated in the large visual event : “Uno de cada clase” in 1995. In May 2022 the Foundation showed the exhibition Vest + Menté with the recent work on paper and screen by the Swiss-Cuban artist Daniel Garbade, curated by Nuria Delgado and Alejandro Baro.

International artists such as Glenda León, René Peña, Juan Carlos Alom and Lázaro Saavedra participated in the First National Festival of Video Art in Havana (2001) organized by the Foundation.

References 

Museums in Havana
Art museums and galleries in Cuba
Arts organizations based in Cuba